Antoni Józef Śmieszek (1881–1943) was a Polish Egyptologist and linguist.

Śmieszek studied linguistics and classical philology at the University of Kraków in 1901 and later at the Universities of Munich, Berlin and London. Śmieszek wrote on Egyptian religion and linguistics in Polish periodicals and general collective works. A chair of Egyptology was created for him at Poznań, 1921–1923 and later at Warsaw, 1934–1939.

References

 

Smieszek Antoni
Smieszek Antoni
Jagiellonian University alumni
Smieszek Antoni
Linguists from Poland
Polish educators
Polish non-fiction writers
Polish male non-fiction writers
Ludwig Maximilian University of Munich alumni
Alumni of the University of London
Humboldt University of Berlin alumni
20th-century linguists
20th-century non-fiction writers
Polish Africanists
Suicides in Poland